Avondale Forest is a wooded estate in County Wicklow, Ireland, on the west bank of the River Avonmore. It contains the home of Charles Stewart Parnell which was built in 1777 by Samuel Hayes and is now the Parnell Museum. The park is rich in wildlife and notable features include the exotic tree trail and a well-developed arboretum.

Habitats and ecology
Avondale is reflective of the wider practices and history of Irish forests.  Little native woodland remains, foreign species are planted for their high return and little thought was given to restoring Ireland's native woodlands.

Avondale Forest Park 
The forest park lies mainly on the west bank of the Avonmore River covering 214 hectares of land. The ruins of Parnell's old sawmill and Parnell's well are located in the park.

Forest Trails
Centenary Walk, River walk along the banks of the Avonmore River, Exotic Tree Trail, Slí na Sláinte (path to health walk), Cairn Walk and Pine Trail.

There is a weekly parkrun every Saturday at 9:30 am.

Avondale House

The mansion was the birthplace in 1846 of patriot Charles Stewart Parnell. It was opened as the Charles Stewart Parnell Museum in 1986.

Avondale Forest Park was redeveloped between late 2019 and 2020. A new cafe restaurant was built along with a visitor centre on 'the great ride' (a long stretch of green space in the middle of Avondale along which horses were ridden in times past), and new subterranean and new tree canopy walkways were also developed.

References

External links
Avondale Forest Park, Map and description 
Avondale Forest Park, Coillte Visitor Details
Avondale Forest Park, Travel Info
Avondale House and Forest Park  

Forests and woodlands of the Republic of Ireland
Protected areas of County Wicklow